Imperata is a small but widespread genus of tropical and subtropical grasses, commonly known as satintails.

Satintail grass species are perennial rhizomatous herbs with solid, erect stems and silky inflorescences. The best known species is Imperata cylindrica, which is recognized as a devastating noxious weed in many places and cultivated as an ornamental plant in others.

The genus is named after Ferrante Imperato, a Renaissance apothecary who lived in Naples in the late-16th and early-17th centuries. His collection included a herbarium.

Species
, Plants of the World Online accepted the following species:
 Imperata brasiliensis - South + Central America, West Indies, southern Mexico
 Imperata brevifolia - southwestern US (CA AZ NV UT NM TX)
 Imperata cheesemanii - Kermadec Islands (part of New Zealand)
 Imperata condensata - Argentina, Chile
 Imperata conferta - plumegrass, kunay grass - Southeast Asia, Papuasia, Micronesia
 Imperata contracta - guayanilla - South + Central America, West Indies, southern Mexico
 Imperata cylindrica - bladygrass, cogongrass, speargrass, silver-spike - Africa, southern Europe, southwestern Asia; introduced in central and eastern Asia, North America, various islands
 Imperata flavida - Hainan Province in China
 Imperata minutiflora - Ecuador, Peru, Bolivia, Brazil, Argentina
 Imperata parodii - southern Chile
 Imperata tenuis - Bolivia, Peru, Ecuador, Brazil, Corrientes Province of Argentina

Formerly Included
Various species have been relocated to other genera, such as Cinna, Lagurus, Miscanthus Saccharum, and Tripidium:
 Imperata eulalioides - Miscanthus sacchariflorus 
 Imperata exaltata - Tripidium arundinaceum 
 Imperata klaga - Saccharum spontaneum
 Imperata ovata - Lagurus ovatus
 Imperata saccharifera - Cinna arundinacea
 Imperata sacchariflora - Miscanthus sacchariflorus 
 Imperata sara - Tripidium bengalense (syn. Saccharum bengalense)
 Imperata spontanea - Saccharum spontaneum
 Imperata tinctoria - Miscanthus tinctorius

References

Andropogoneae
Poaceae genera